Košarkaški klub Žitko Basket, commonly referred to as KK Žitko Basket, is a men's basketball club based in Belgrade, Serbia. They are currently competing in the Second Basketball League of Serbia.

History 
The club got media attention in the mid-2010s due to the basketball development of Bogdan Bogdanović who played for their youth system before signed for Partizan in September 2010. Also, the club got attention in 2020 due to a similarity of their logo with one from the Golden State Warriors. The club logo has the Ada Bridge silhouette.

In April 2021, the club won the First Regional League Central Division for the 2020–21 season and got promoted to the Second League of Serbia for the 2021–22 season.

Players 

  Marko Čakarević
  Bogdan Riznić

Head coaches 

  Dragan Jakovljević (2000–2013, 2014–2019)
  Milan Stevanović (2021)
  Marko Boras (2021–2022)
  Nenad Karanović (2022–present)

Season-by-season

Trophies and awards

Trophies
 First Regional League, Center Division (3rd-tier)
 Winners (1): 2020–21

Notable players 
Youth system
  Marko Čakarević
  Bogdan Bogdanović

References

External links
 Profile at srbijasport.net 
 Profile at eurobasket.com
 Profile at Belgrade Basketball Association

Žitko
Žitko
Basketball teams in Belgrade